Nam-myeon, also called Nam (South) Township, or Nam for short, is a myeon (township) in Yeosu city of South Jeolla Province, South Korea. The myeon is located in south-eastern part of the city. The township hall is located in Baegya-ri, at 10, Naeoejin-gil, Nam-myeon. Hwajeong-myeon and Gamak Bay are to the northwest, Dolsan-eup is to the north, Gamak Bay and Dolsan-eup is to the northeast, and the South Sea is to the south. The myeon is made up of islands, and it is second-most southern myeon in Yeosu, after Samsan-myeon.

References

External links
 여수시 남면사무소

Yeosu
Towns and townships in South Jeolla Province